The 2013–14 season was the 27th season of División de Honor, the top flight women's water polo in Spain since its inception in 1988.

The season comprised regular season and championship playoff. The regular season started on October 19, 2013, and finished on May 3, 2014. When finish the regular season, top four teams at standings play championship playoff.

Championship playoff began on May 14 with semifinals, playing the Finals around late May.

Sabadell Astralpool won the twelfth title in its history, and fourth in a row by defeating (again as in previous season) Mataró La Sirena 2–0 in the Championship Finals.

Teams

Regular season standings

Source:

Championship playoffs

Semifinals

1st leg

2nd leg

Sabadell Astralpool won series 2–0 and advanced to Final

Mataró La Sirena won series 2–0 and advanced to Final

Final

1st leg

2nd leg

Sabadell Astralpool won the Championship Finals series 2–0.

Individual awards
 Championship MVP:  Maica García, CN Sabadell Astralpool
 Best Goalkeeper:  Laura Ester, CN Sabadell Astralpool
 Top goalscorer:  Helena Lloret, CN Sabadell Astralpool

Relegation playoff
Playoff to be played in two legs. First leg to be played on 10 May and 2nd leg on 17 May. The winner will play in División de Honor Femenina 2014–15 and the loser one in Primera División.

|}

1st leg

2nd leg

16–16 on aggregate. Concepción–Cdad Lineal won the penalty shoot-out 4–3 and promoted to División de Honor.

Top goal scorers 

(regular season only)

See also
 División de Honor de Waterpolo 2013–14

References

External links
 2013–14 season schedule
 Competition format

División de Honor Femenina de Waterpolo
Seasons in Spanish water polo competitions
Spain
2013 in women's water polo
2014 in women's water polo
2013 in Spanish women's sport
2014 in Spanish women's sport